The 2011 New Hampshire Wildcats football team represented the University of New Hampshire in the 2011 NCAA Division I FCS football season. The Wildcats were led by 13th-year head coach Sean McDonnell and played their home games at Cowell Stadium. They are a member of the Colonial Athletic Association. They finished the season 8–4, 6–2 in CAA play to finish in a three-way tie for second place. They received an at-large bid into the FCS playoffs where they lost in the second round to Montana State.

Schedule

References

New Hampshire
New Hampshire Wildcats football seasons
New Hampshire
New Hampshire Wildcats football